Cardoen may refer to:

Carlos Cardoen, a Chilean businessman and weapon scientist
Johan Cardoen, Belgian biologist and businessman